Fukui Station is the name of multiple train stations in Japan.

 Fukui Station (Fukui) - (福井駅) in Fukui Prefecture
 Fukui Station (Okayama) - (福井駅) in Okayama Prefecture
 Fukui Station (Tochigi) - (福居駅) in Tochigi Prefecture